Rinaldo Stanley Entingh (June 9, 1953) is a former Surinamese footballer. He played as a midfielder in the SVB Hoofdklasse for S.V. Robinhood and for the Suriname national team.

Biography 
Entingh was born June 9, 1953. He began his career with S.V. Robinhood where he progressed through the youth ranks. Through the seventies he formed the attack of the first team together with Errol Emanuelson and Roy George in what would be one of the club's most successful periods. Helping Robinhood to 4 appearances in the CONCACAF Champions' Cup finals in 1976, 1977, 1982, 1983. With Robinhood, Entingh would champion the Hoofdklasse nine times, namely in 1975, 1976, 1979, 1980, 1981, 1983, 1984, 1985, 1986, also winning the Surinamese Footballer of the Year award in 1974 and in 1983.

Entingh played for the Suriname national team almost his entire playing career. He made his debut for the first team in 1972 in a 1–1 draw against Trinidad and Tobago for the country's 1974 FIFA World Cup qualifying campaign. He scored his first goal against the Netherlands Antilles in Willemstad, Curaçao, scoring the opener in a 1–1 draw.

In 1978, Entingh helped Suriname to win the CFU Championship. He also helped his country to an eighth-place finish in the final round of the 1978 FIFA World Cup qualification in Mexico. He played for the Olympic team in their 1980 Summer Olympics qualification. He also played in the 1982 and 1986 FIFA World Cup qualifications for Suriname.

In March 2021, Rinaldo Entingh has sent good luck wishes to the Suriname national football team for the 2022 FIFA World Cup qualifiers.

Career statistics

International goals
Scores and results list Suriname' goal tally first.

Honours

Club
S.V. Robinhood
 SVB Hoofdklasse (9): 1975, 1976, 1979, 1980, 1981, 1983, 1984, 1985, 1986
 CONCACAF Champions' Cup Runners-up (4): 1976, 1977, 1982, 1983

International
Suriname
 CFU Championship (1): 1978

Individual
Surinamese Footballer of the Year (2): 1974, 1983

References 

1953 births
Living people
Sportspeople from Paramaribo
Surinamese footballers
Suriname international footballers
S.V. Robinhood players
SVB Eerste Divisie players
Association football midfielders